The Un-Men are a group of fictional characters in the DC/Vertigo Comics universe. Created by the writer/artist team of Len Wein and Berni Wrightson, the Un-Men made their first appearance in 1972, in issues #1–2 of the original Swamp Thing comic book series. The characters made subsequent appearances in later issues of Swamp Thing and its successor series, The Saga of the Swamp Thing (vol. 2) (later re-named Swamp Thing (vol. 2)), and in the 1994 five-issue Vertigo miniseries, American Freak: A Tale of the Un-Men. In August 2007, Vertigo (DC's "mature readers line") launched The Un-Men, a monthly comic book series chronicling the further exploits of these characters. 13 issues of that title were published.

History

Appearances in Swamp Thing comics
As described in Swamp Thing #2, the Un-Men are "synthetic men" created by the evil sorcerer/scientist Anton Arcane in his mountain castle in the Balkans. In that story arc, Arcane dispatches a group of these deformed creatures to Louisiana to capture the Swamp Thing. Obsessed with obtaining immortality, the elderly and ailing Arcane intends to transfer his mind and soul into the Swamp Thing's indestructible plant body. Arcane explains to the captive plant creature that the Un-Men "are the result of my first experimentations — crude, but totally dedicated to me". Unsuitable for Arcane's body-switching schemes, the Un-Men mindlessly serve their "master" as obedient henchmen. At the end of the story arc, the Swamp Thing chases Arcane to the top of his castle tower, and the old man plunges to his death. His loyal Un-Men jump after him like lemmings, presumably to their deaths as well.

Wrightson depicted the Un-Men as hideously deformed humanoid creatures, no two of whom were alike. It is not entirely clear how Arcane constructed his Un-Men, but several of them are made of stitched-together body parts, like Frankenstein's monster. The resulting creatures sport all manner and class of bodily aberrations: multiple heads, extra limbs, and even partial animal anatomies.

The two most distinctive Un-Men were Ophidian, a talking snake-like creature with 10 pairs of legs and hypnotic powers, and Cranius, Arcane's majordomo and the leader of the Un-Men. Described as "the living brain", Cranius is an oversized brain with a human face that is grafted onto a large human hand. Cranius uses his fingers for locomotion. In later appearances, Cranius is shown to have telepathic powers. The Un-Men and Arcane (reborn in an Un-Man body made by his creations) returned in issue #10 to further harass the Swamp Thing, in the last issue to be illustrated by Wrightson.

The Un-Men made their next appearance in the second Swamp Thing comic book series, The Saga of the Swamp Thing (vol. 2) #17–19, launched by DC in 1982 to capitalize on Wes Craven's Swamp Thing movie adaptation. Arcane again returns with a cadre of Un-Men. Writer Martin Pasko and artists Stephen R. Bissette and John Totleben retconned the earlier storyline: In the new version, the slave ghosts from Swamp Thing #10 turned the Un-Men against their maker. As Arcane explains: "They tore me limb from limb. They buried each part of my dismembered body in a separate grave, then vanished, never to be seen again".

Other Un-Men later exhumed Arcane's body parts, and rebuilt his artificial body, this time even less well than they did before, forcing him to create an insectoid mechanical exo-skeleton for himself in order to function. He then created a second-generation group of insectoid Un-Men in various colors and shapes: caterpillars, centipedes, praying mantises, moths, wasps and other pests, usually with human-like heads. At the end of this story arc, Arcane is eaten by his own Un-Men, defeated for the third time, and for the second time at the hands of his own creations.

Swamp Thing (vol. 2) #82–83 explored Arcane's early history as a battlefield medic for the German Army during World War I. The young Arcane is shown stitching together the body parts of dead soldiers in a series of unauthorized necromantic experiments. The same story arc delves into Arcane's World War II-era activities. As a trusted aide of Hitler, the middle-aged Arcane, headquartered at a slaughterhouse, has successfully created his first Un-Men. He calls them prototypes "cobbled together from whatever body parts I could get my hands on". Boasting that they are "infinitely adaptable", Arcane reveals that he plans to build an Un-Men army of obedient, "perfect soldiers" who "never complain and always follow orders". But before he can muster his Un-Men army, Allied bombs destroy the slaughterhouse, and, presumably, the Un-Men.

Although Arcane would more than occasionally return from the grave to stalk the Swamp Thing, the Un-Men would not return for another decade. Their next appearance was in Swamp Thing (vol. 2) #136–138, in a story arc that had Arcane returning to Earth from Hell and demonically possessing the preserved body of the late General Sunderland, the defense contractor who had frozen and vivisected the Swamp Thing a decade earlier in Alan Moore's celebrated story, "The Anatomy Lesson". Neither Cranius nor any of the insectoid Un-Men appear in this arc. Rather, Arcane is shown creating a new group of Un-Men, most notably the psychic Dr. Polygon, a purple man with nine or so faces on his head. Multiple ogre-like Un-Men are shown at Sunderland Corp. headquarters in Washington, D.C. At the end of this arc, Sunderland's daughter, Connie, turns against Arcane and blows up the Sunderland facility, Arcane, and, presumably, most of the Un-Men.

American Freak: A Tale of the Un-Men miniseries
In 1994, Vertigo published a five-issue miniseries, American Freak: A Tale of the Un-Men, written by Dave Louapre and illustrated by Vince Locke. American Freak focused on a completely new set of characters, described as the offspring of the original Arcane Un-Men. The miniseries also introduced a number of continuity errors into the Un-Men mythology. In American Freak, it is revealed that in 1969 a U.S. army special tactics team captured 13 "horribly disfigured" creatures, "definitely not human", hardly even animal, "deep in the Louisiana swamp". If this plot point is intended to represent events occurring after the mutilation of Arcane by his Un-Men (as depicted in Swamp Thing #10), the date and number of Un-Men is incorrect. In Louapre's story, the military guards, rather than Arcane, dubbed these creatures "Un-Men".

The plot of American Freak revolves around the second-generation son of two of these "horribly disfigured creatures", a 23-year-old man named Damien Kane. Per this miniseries, the Army conducted painful, inhumane experiments on the captive Un-Men, toward the goal of "mating" them and then producing a "serum" that would eliminate deformity in the offspring. The serum proved unstable and all of the offspring, except for Damien Kane, died. Kane developed normally until he turned 23 years of age, at which time (the beginning of this miniseries) he began to horribly mutate. The story follows Kane’s painful transformation into a freak, and his escape with the assistance of a telepathic, first-generation Un-Man named Crassus. Crassus tricks Kane into traveling with him to Romania, promising the boy that Arcane might be able to help reverse the mutation. Of course, it is a trick: Crassus knows that Arcane is no longer in his castle fortress. Crassus’s secret goal is to make Kane rescue a gaggle of other next generation Un-Men from the clutches of a depraved millionaire who forces them to perform in a private sideshow.

Through some form of prophecy that is never explained, the next-generation Un-Men recognize Kane as "the One" they have long expected to deliver them from captivity. Kane reluctantly helps his cousins revolt and slaughter their tormentors. The Un-Men then board a private jet for America, where they proceed to set the captive, cryogenically frozen original Un-Men free. Army soldiers and guns are involved, and ultimately Kane’s love interest, a bald, legless and psychic second-generation Un-Woman named Scylla, is mowed down with bullets. The original Un-Men — mute and apparently mentally retarded — toss themselves into a vat of acid. Meanwhile, Crassus vanishes into the darkness of the swamp.

The military experiments are exposed, and Kane and his fellow survivors become celebrities, gracing the cover of LIFE Magazine and appearing on TV talk shows. An embarrassed federal government grants them their own reservation settlement (on a former nuclear testing site) and Goth teens pay homage to the freaks at the camp perimeter. Ironically, the Un-Men have become caged curiosities yet again. At the end of issue #5, Kane has mutated into an endomorph, a veiny elder statesman narrating his tale from a private cave high above the new Un-Men encampment.

Monthly series
A monthly series, written by John Whalen and illustrated by Mike Hawthorne, premiered in August 2007 and saw a 13-issue run. The first story arc takes place more than a decade after the founding of the Un-Men reservation in American Freak. Damien Kane has apparently died and his reservation has been taken over by a coterie of Arcane's original Un-Men, led by Cranius. Under the control of Cranius, the reservation has been transformed into Aberrance U.S.A., a freak-themed tourist attraction that is equal parts Disneyland, Las Vegas, and carnival sideshow. The private police force and staff who control Aberrance are next-generation Un-Men created by Cranius. When a  "natural-born" performing freak (i.e., not an Un-Man) from Aberrance is murdered, Agent Kilcrop of the U.S. Department of Energy (D.O.E.), which continues to oversee the one-time H-bomb test site, is called in to investigate.

Kilcrop, an African American albino, believes that his superiors at the D.O.E. picked him for the assignment because they consider him to be their "house freak". Kilcrop suspects that Cranius and company may be involved in a cover-up of the missing performer's death. Facing the resistance of Cranius, et al., but gaining the unanticipated aid of Niko Parish, a stunningly beautiful "Un-Woman" angel-girl lacking an arm (Cranius modeled her transformation on the famous "Winged Victory of Samothrace" statue), Kilcrop uncovers a conspiracy in a town divided by the Un-Men and the "gaffs", natural-born freaks marginalized as second-class citizens by the custom-built Un-Men. The term "gaff" is a play on the real-life carnival colloquialism for "faked freaks", such as sawdust-stuffed "Fiji Mermaids" and other phony sideshow attractions. The artificially enhanced Un-Men apparently consider the natural-born freaks of Aberrance to be "fakes", i.e., "pretenders" and "nature's accidents" who pale in comparison to the Promethean creations of Anton Arcane and the next-generation Un-Men built by Arcane's first lieutenant, Cranius.

Kilcrop learns that a subset of the local gaffs have formed a religious cult around the late Damien Kane, founder of Aberrance and a figure romanticized by locals as a "freak's tribune". Although Kane himself was a second-generation Un-Man, his compassion for all of the freaks of Aberrance—natural and enhanced—has made him a kind of latter-day saint in the eyes of the oppressed gaffs. The gaffs believe that Kane will return to avenge the hostile takeover of Aberrance by Cranius and the other original Un-Men. Over the course of the first five-issue story arc, it is revealed that Damien Kane is still alive—more or less—having mutated into an endomorphic mass of "Kaneflesh", a living and apparently sentient organism that Cranius has trapped and locked away in a hidden laboratory behind his office. Cranius has been secretly using the Kaneflesh—which has remarkable regenerative properties—to create the radical body modifications of his next-generation Un-Men, including Niko's winged enhancements. Unknown to Cranius, however, the Kaneflesh transplantations (Cranius calls the cellular extract "Compound K") have given Damien Kane limited telepathic control of these new Un-Men. In the course of the story arc, Kilcrop discovers that the captive Kane has been telepathically directing Cranius' next-generation Un-Men to murder the original Un-Men who seized control of Aberrance. This is Kane's vengeance for Cranius' subversion of the original utopian vision of a freak's sanctuary. The Kaneflesh escapes from Cranius' lab and attacks Cranius on the rooftop of the Un-Men corporate headquarters. Kilcrop destroys the angry creature, saving Cranius in the process. At the end of the story arc, Cranius hints to Kilcrop that the federal agent has a deeper connection to the Un-Men than he now realizes. Kilcrop is baffled by this suggestion, and, like readers of the comic, he will have to wait for a future issue for that mystery to be resolved.

After the events of the Kaneflesh storyline, Cranius intercedes with the government—which is secretly funding the Un-Men's freak-building experiments—and has Agent Kilcrop reassigned to become permanent chief of security in Aberrance. Kilcrop accepts the assignment only after Niko—with whom he has become enamored—urges him to take the job. Eventually, it is revealed that Kilcrop was a circus performer who entered violent staged matches against his (non-albino) brother, has a past with Cranius, and, as one of the heads of the Aberrance, "inseminated" himself so he could have an heir.

Shortly after Kilcrop settles his attrites with Cranius about his past (Cranius, as a sign of goodwill, restored his father's corpse as a barely functional zombie to wind up his frustrations on it), a new blow falls on Kilcrop's life. Doctor Sunderland, a beauty-obsessed scientist, comes to Aberrance to aid Cranius in restoring Compound K, in exchange for a cadre of insectoid, bestial Un-Men to sell as living weaponry. Cranius accepts, offering Janus Sr. new offspring for the necessary stem cell research. Niko, the only one able to tell Kilcrop of the plot, is shushed under the threat of revealing her past before Aberrance: a wanted felon for killing her abusive father.

The insectoid Un-Men are freed in Aberrance, showing the ability to "infect" over beings. Kilcrop is able to contain the skirmish, but during the revolt several guards are killed, Janus Sr. has his head frozen into liquid nitrogen by Cranius in self-defense, and Niko Parish is turned in an almost mindless humanoid praying mantis, but not before being able to profess her love for Kilcrop.

Agent Kilcrop allows the D.O.E. to put him on trial for his inability to contain the rebellion; he is stripped from his role, disgraced in the F.B.I. ranks, and considered a "person of interest". Aberrance is shut down, and Kilcrop aids Cranius into finding a cure able to give Niko her human self back.

Since Vertigo cancelled the series, the plotline about Niko Parish and the still-living Un-Men and gaffs of Aberrance is likely to stay unresolved.

The New 52
In September 2011, The New 52 rebooted DC's continuity. In this new timeline, the Un-Men are first seen accompanying Felix Faust, the Rotlings, and the rotted heroes and villains in the attack upon the Red. The Un-Men later engage Swamp Thing and the forces of the Green outside of Anton Arcane's castle.

Members
 Cranius – one of the original Un-Men
 Damien Kane
 Ophidian – one of the original Un-Men  
 The Patchwork Man (Gregori Arcane)

In other media

Television
In the 1991 Swamp Thing animated series and toy line, five Un-Men were introduced as humans temporary mutated by Anton Arcane's transducer machine. Three Un-Men under Arcane include Dr. Deemo (a bokor mutated into a snake), Skinman (a zombie mutated into a bat), and Weed Killer (a plant exterminator mutated into a leech/centipede monster). The other Un-Men, being one-time only, were Arcane (a spider-like monster) and Bayou Jack (who was mutated into a mantis-like monster).

Film
The 1989 film The Return of Swamp Thing featured several creatures genetically engineered by Arcane's team of scientists, including a leech-man and a scientist who becomes a giant-brained monster. They are not referred to by name as Un-Men.

See also
 Swamp Thing
 Anton Arcane
 Freak

References

External links

 
 
 Unofficial Un-Men Biography
 American Freak Title Index
 Un-Men at DC Comics Wiki
 Mike Hawthorne blog – Art from Vertigo's The Un-Men
 Cranius Design Sketch – Character sketch by Mike Hawthorne
 Anatomy of a Cover – Tomer Hanuka's Un-Men cover art
 Roots of the Swamp Thing—Containing a complete history of the Un-Men

Interviews
 Getting Freaky with Vertigo's Un-Men, interview with John Whalen and Mike Hawthorne, Comic Book Resources, November 8, 2006
 Unearthing Un-Men: Mike Hawthorne on His Vertigo Series, Newsarama, November 8, 2006
 Talking About The Un-Men With Mike Hawthorne, Newsarama, September 14, 2007
Un-Mentionable Dialogue, interview with John Whalen, Comics Bulletin, April 14, 2008

2007 comics debuts
Characters created by Len Wein
Comics characters introduced in 1972
DC Comics characters with superhuman strength
DC Comics supervillains
Fictional slaves
DC Comics undead characters
Horror comics
Vertigo Comics titles